The Theiss Speedster is an American Homebuilt ultralight biplane that was designed and produced by Theiss Aviation of Salem, Ohio. When it was available the aircraft was supplied as a quick-build kit for amateur construction.

The Speedster is intended to resemble a 1920s era sport aircraft.

Design and development

The Speedster features a strut-braced biplane layout with interplane struts, a single-seat open cockpit, fixed conventional landing gear with wheel pants and a single engine in tractor configuration. The top wing is mounted on top of the fuselage instead of the more usual arrangement with cabane struts suspending it above the fuselage.

The aircraft is made from a combination of aluminium, wood, steel and foam.

The manufacturer estimates the construction time from the supplied kit as 400 hours.

After producing the Speedster, the company turned its attention to produce unmanned aerial vehicles for the US Navy and no longer produces manned aircraft.

Operational history
By 1998 the company reported that two aircraft were completed and flying.

Specifications (Speedster)

References

External links
Photos of the Speedster on the company history page

Speedster
1990s United States sport aircraft
1990s United States ultralight aircraft
Single-engined tractor aircraft
Biplanes
Homebuilt aircraft